de Plancy is a French toponym, relating to Plancy-l'Abbaye
 Miles de Plancy (d.1174) crusader

There is no aristocratic family "de Plancy," but "de Plancy" was added to the commoner surname Collin by
 Jacques Collin de Plancy:

Also borne by his son:
 Victor Collin de Plancy